Charles Cumont was a Belgian modern pentathlete who competed at the 1928 Summer Olympics. He finished in 35th equal place with Josef Schejbal.

References

External links
 

Year of birth missing
Possibly living people
Belgian male modern pentathletes
Olympic modern pentathletes of Belgium
Modern pentathletes at the 1928 Summer Olympics
20th-century Belgian people